The House of Elders or Mesherano Jirga, was the upper house of the bicameral National Assembly of Afghanistan, alongside the lower House of the People (Wolesi Jirga). It was effectively dissolved when the Taliban seized power on 15 August 2021. The Taliban did not include the House of Elders and several other agencies of the former government in its first national budget in May 2022. Government spokesman Innamullah Samangani said that due to the financial crisis, only active agencies were included in the budget, and the excluded ones had been dissolved, but noted they could be brought back "if needed".

The House of Elders primarily had an advisory role rather than a maker of law. However, it does have some veto power.

The House of Elders has 102 members. One-third (34) were elected by district councils (one per province) for three-year terms, one-third (34) by provincial councils (one per province) for four-year terms, and one-third (34) were nominated by the president for five-year terms. However, elections for the district councils were not held in the 2005 parliamentary elections. As such, each provincial council also selected one of its elected members to temporarily hold seats in the house until district council elections were held. Half of the presidential nominees had to be women, two representatives from the disabled and impaired and two from the Kuchis.

Speakers 
Speakers of the Mesherano Jirga since establishment in 1931

Reserved seats for women
Having been absent from the decision-making process for centuries, Afghan women for the first time entered the political arena in 2001, after the overthrow of Taliban. With the introduction of reserved seats provision in the 2002 Emergency Loya Jirga, when ten percent of 1600 seats were reserved for women, the ground was laid for participation of Afghan women in parliament.

The new 2004 constitution secured reserved seats for women and minorities in both houses of parliament. In the 2005 parliamentarian elections, Afghan women won 89 seats. According to the Inter-Parliamentary Union, in 2009 they held 67 seats (27.7%) in the House of the People and 22 (21.6%) in the House of Elders. This representation is above the worldwide average of 18.5% and above the average of the United States at 16.8% for the House and 15.4% for the Senate.

See also
National Assembly of Afghanistan
House of the People (Afghanistan)
Politics of Afghanistan
List of legislatures by country

References

External links
Official website (archived 15 August 2021)

Elders
Afghanistan
1931 establishments in Afghanistan
2005 establishments in Afghanistan